Víctor Maldonado Flores (born August 3, 1939 in Lagunillas, Zulia) is a retired track and field athlete from Venezuela. He competed in the hurdling events. Maldonado represented his native country at three consecutive Summer Olympics, starting in 1960. He was second in the 1963 Pan American Games 4 × 400 metres relay (with Hortensio Fucil, Arístides Pineda and Leslie Mentor). In the 1959 Pan American Games, Maldonado finished sixth in the 400 metres hurdles and in the 1963 Pan American Games 400 metres hurdles he finished fourth.

Achievements

References
sports-reference

1939 births
Living people
People from Zulia
Venezuelan male hurdlers
Athletes (track and field) at the 1960 Summer Olympics
Athletes (track and field) at the 1964 Summer Olympics
Athletes (track and field) at the 1968 Summer Olympics
Olympic athletes of Venezuela
Athletes (track and field) at the 1959 Pan American Games
Athletes (track and field) at the 1963 Pan American Games
Pan American Games silver medalists for Venezuela
Pan American Games medalists in athletics (track and field)
Central American and Caribbean Games gold medalists for Venezuela
Central American and Caribbean Games silver medalists for Venezuela
Competitors at the 1959 Central American and Caribbean Games
Competitors at the 1962 Central American and Caribbean Games
Competitors at the 1966 Central American and Caribbean Games
Central American and Caribbean Games medalists in athletics
Medalists at the 1963 Pan American Games
20th-century Venezuelan people
21st-century Venezuelan people